is a Japanese professional wrestler currently signed to both All Elite Wrestling (AEW) in the United States and DDT Pro-Wrestling (DDT) in Japan. Takeshita was named the Rookie of the Year by Tokyo Sports in 2013 and is the youngest KO-D Openweight Champion in history, having won the title on his 21st birthday. In DDT, he has also held the KO-D Tag Team Championship, the KO-D 6-Man Tag Team Championship and the Ironman Heavymetalweight Championship. Takeshita signed with AEW in November 2022, after a successful tour of the United States earlier that year.

Professional wrestling career

DDT Pro-Wrestling (2011–present)
Takeshita, with a sports background in track and field, began training for a career in professional wrestling in 2011 with the DDT Pro-Wrestling promotion. Takeshita had been a professional wrestling fan since childhood and as a 12-year old had attended a DDT show, where he was kissed by wrestler Danshoku Dino. On April 1, 2012, DDT announced that Takeshita would be debuting for the promotion on August 18 in Tokyo's Nippon Budokan. Prior to his debut match, Takeshita took part in exhibition matches. During one of these matches on August 4, Takeshita scored an upset win over Hiroshi Fukuda, winning the Ironman Heavymetalweight Championship in the process. The title had a 24/7 rule, where it could be won anytime and anywhere. As Takeshita was being congratulated by DDT general manager Amon Tsurumi for winning his first match before his debut, Fukuda hit him with a low blow and then pinned him to regain the title.

On August 18, 2012, Takeshita was defeated by El Generico in his official debut match. On November 25, Takeshita pinned Poison Sawada Julie in his retirement match, a six-man tag team match. At the end of 2013, Tokyo Sports named Takeshita Japanese professional wrestling's Rookie of the Year, with him becoming the first wrestler still in high school to win the award. He also finished second in Wrestling Observer Newsletters award category for Rookie of the Year, losing to Yohei Komatsu by four votes (906–902).

On January 26, 2014, Takeshita received his first-ever shot at one of the King of DDT (KO-D) titles, when he and Tetsuya Endo challenged for the KO-D Tag Team Championship in a three-way match, which was won by the Golden☆Lovers (Kenny Omega and Kota Ibushi) and also included Isami Kodaka and Yuko Miyamoto. On May 6, Takeshita came together with Antonio Honda to form the "Happy Motel" stable. The two were eventually joined by Tetsuya Endo, with whom they went on to win the KO-D 6-Man Tag Team Championship by defeating Shuten-dōji (Kudo, Masa Takanashi and Yukio Sakaguchi) on July 13. They lost the title back to Shuten-dōji seven days later.

On August 17, Takeshita took part in a high-profile interpromotional match, when he was defeated by New Japan Pro-Wrestling (NJPW) representative Hiroshi Tanahashi at DDT's annual Ryōgoku Kokugikan event. On September 28, Takeshita and Endo defeated Kenny Omega and Kota Ibushi to win the KO-D Tag Team Championship for the first time. Afterwards, Omega dubbed Takeshita the "Future of DDT". Takeshita and Endo went on to lose the title to Daisuke Sekimoto and Yuji Okabayashi on February 15, 2015. The following June, Takeshita made it to the finals of the 2015 King of DDT tournament, but was defeated there by Yukio Sakaguchi. On December 23, Takeshita and Endo defeated Shigehiro Irie and Yuji Okabayashi in the finals of a tournament to regain the vacant KO-D Tag Team Championship.

With Kudo sidelined with an injury and Kota Ibushi announcing his resignation from DDT, Takeshita was poised to take a larger role in the promotion. On January 3, 2016, he received his first shot at DDT's top title, the KO-D Openweight Championship, but was defeated by the defending champion, Isami Kodaka. On March 21, Takeshita and Endo lost the KO-D Tag Team Championship to Daisuke Sasaki and Shuji Ishikawa. On May 29, his 21st birthday, Takeshita defeated Daisuke Sasaki to win the KO-D Openweight Championship for the first time. With the win, Takeshita became the youngest KO-D Openweight Champion in history, beating the previous record held by Nosawa Rongai by three years and six months. On June 15, Takeshita made his debut for All Japan Pro Wrestling (AJPW), teaming with Tetsuya Endo in a tag team match, where they defeated Jun Akiyama and Yuma Aoyagi. On July 17, Takeshita successfully defended the KO-D Openweight Championship against his tag team partner Tetsuya Endo. After the match, Endo turned on Takeshita and joined Daisuke Sasaki's Damnation stable. After three successful title defenses, Takeshita lost the KO-D Openweight Championship to Shuji Ishikawa on August 28 at DDT's biggest event of the year, Ryōgoku Peter Pan 2016. On December 4, Takeshita and Mike Bailey defeated Daisuke Sasaki and Tetsuya Endo to win the KO-D Tag Team Championship. They lost the title to Masakatsu Funaki and Yukio Sakaguchi in their second defense on January 9, 2017.

On January 29, Takeshita defeated Kudo in the finals of a tournament to become the number one contender to the KO-D Openweight Championship. At Judgement 2017: DDT 20th Anniversary event, Takeshita defeated Harashima to win the KO-D Openweight Championship for the second time. The following month, Takeshita and Akito formed a new tag team named "All Out". On August 20 at the 2017 Ryōgoku Peter Pan show, Takeshita made his seventh successful defense of the KO-D Openweight Championship against 2017 King of DDT winner Tetsuya Endo. On October 22, Takeshita set a new record for most successful defenses of the KO-D Openweight Championship by making his ninth defense against Danshoku Dino. On November 2, Takeshita became a double champion, when he and his All Out stablemates Akito and Diego defeated Damnation (Daisuke Sasaki, Mad Paulie and Shuji Ishikawa) to win the vacant KO-D 6-Man Tag Team Championship. On November 28, Takeshita and Yuki Ueno won the cross-promotional 2017 Differ Cup by defeating the Pro Wrestling Noah team of Hitoshi Kumano and Katsuhiko Nakajima in the finals. This marked the first Differ Cup held in 10 years. On December 10, All Out lost the KO-D 6-Man Tag Team Championship to Shuten-dōji.

On December 30, 2018, Takeshita won the D-Oh Grand Prix 2019 by defeating Go Shiozaki in the finals.

On February 17, 2019, Takeshita defeated Daisuke Sasaki to win his third KO-D Openweight Championship. On Apil 4, at DDT Is Coming to America, Takeshita lost the title to Daisuke Sasaki. Later on, Tetsuya Endo cashed in his "Right To Challenge Anytime, Anywhere" contract to win the title. On May 19, Takeshita defeated Soma Takao in the finals of the 2019 King of DDT tournament and thus became the number one contender to the KO-D Openweight Championship then held by Endo. On June 24, along with his All Out stablemates Shunma Katsumata and Yuki Iino, he won the KO-D 6-Man Tag Team Championship by defeating Chihiro Hashimoto, Dash Chisako and Meiko Satomura. On July 15, at Wrestle Peter Pan 2019, he won the KO-D Openweight Championship by defeating Tetsuya Endo.

On March 22, 2020, he lost the 6-man title to the team of Tetsuya Endo, T-Hawk and El Lindaman.

In early 2021, Takeshita announced that All Out would disband with their last match taking place on March 12 in a special All Out produced event. Their farewell match was a tag team match that Takeshita and Akito won against Katsumata and Iino. On March 28, in the pre-show of the Judgement 2021: DDT 24th Anniversary event, Takeshita and Katsumata were announced as entrants in the Ultimate Tag League 2021 where they would represent their new stable The37Kamiina. They won the league by defeating Daisuke Sasaki and Yuji Hino in a tie-breaker match on May 27.

All Elite Wrestling (2021, 2022–present)
During All Elite Wrestling's first-ever non-televised event called "The House Always Wins", Takeshita made his debut for the company in a 10-men tag team match. He teamed alongside members of The Elite, including AEW World Champion Kenny Omega, the former AEW World Tag Team Champions The Young Bucks along with Michael Nakazawa. They lost the match against a team that consisted out of Death Triangle (Pac, Penta El Zero Miedo and Rey Fenix) and the brothers Mike and Matt Sydal. Takeshita then made his YouTube debut for AEW on Dark: Elevation the following Monday competing against Danny Limelight. He won this match with a pinfall after using his finishing move.

Takeshita returned to AEW on the April 25, 2022 episode of AEW Dark: Elevation where he defeated Brandon Cutler. On the May 4 episode AEW Dynamite, he was challenged by Jay Lethal to wrestle him on the next episode of AEW Rampage. On the May 6, 2022 episode of Rampage, Lethal would defeat Takeshita following assistance from his manager Sonjay Dutt and Satnam Singh. On AEW Dynamite on May 18 he was defeated by AEW World Champion "Hangman" Adam Page in a non-title singles match, which was heavily praised by wrestling critics. Takeshita continued to gather wins on Elevation. On the July 6th episode of AEW Rampage, Takeshita lost to Eddie Kingston in a hard-hitting match. Takeshita's impressive matches up to this point earned him an AEW Interim World Championship Eliminator match against then interim champion Jon Moxley on the July 13 special episode of Dynamite titled Fyter Fest, which he lost. At Battle of the Belts III in August, Takeshita fought Claudio Castagnoli for his ROH World Championship, and was defeated. On November 19, it was confirmed that Takeshita had signed with the company, after his match against Eddie Kingston and Ortiz, while keeping his contract with DDT.

Personal life
In February 2014, Takeshita was admitted into the Nippon Sport Science University. In June 2014, he signed with the Oscar Promotion talent agency. His hobbies include weightlifting and bodybuilding. Takeshita has stated that his goal was to take part in the 2020 Tokyo Summer Olympics as a decathlete.

Championships and accomplishmentsDDT Pro-WrestlingIronman Heavymetalweight Championship (4 times)
KO-D 6-Man Tag Team Championship (5 times) – with Antonio Honda and Tetsuya Endo (1), Akito and Diego (1), Akito and Shunma Katsumata (1), Akito and Yuki Iino (1), and Shunma Katsumata and Yuki Iino (1)
KO-D Openweight Championship (5 times)
KO-D Tag Team Championship (4 times) – with Tetsuya Endo (2), Mike Bailey (1) and Shunma Katsumata  (1)
KO-D Openweight Championship Challenger Decision Tournament (2017)
KO-D Tag Team Championship Tournament (2015) – with Tetsuya Endo
D-Oh Grand Prix (2019, 2021 II)
King of DDT Tournament (2019, 2021)
Ultimate Tag League (2021) – with Shunma KatsumataDeadlock Pro-WrestlingDPW Awards (2 times)
Moment of the Year (2022) – 
Match of the Year (2022) - Japan Indie AwardsBest Bout Award (2014) with Tetsuya Endo vs. Kenny Omega and Kota Ibushi on September 28
MVP Award (2021)Pro Wrestling Illustrated Ranked No. 59 of the top 500 singles wrestlers in the PWI 500 in 2022Tokyo SportsFighting Spirit Award (2021)
Newcomer Award (2013)Toshikoshi PuroresuShuffle Tag Tournament (2015) – with Daisuke Sekimoto
Shuffle Tag Tournament (2017) – with Hideki SuzukiOther accomplishmentsDiffer Cup (2017) – with Yuki Ueno
 Wrestling Observer Newsletter'''''
 Most Underrated (2022)

References

External links

DDT Pro-Wrestling profile 
Oscar Promotion profile 

Official blog

1995 births
Living people
Japanese male professional wrestlers
Sportspeople from Osaka
21st-century professional wrestlers
Ironman Heavymetalweight Champions
KO-D 6-Man Tag Team Champions
KO-D Tag Team Champions
KO-D Openweight Champions
All Elite Wrestling personnel